Natalie Christine Horler (born 23 September 1981) is a German-English singer and television presenter, best known for being the lead singer of the Eurodance group Cascada.

Early life and family

Natalie Horler was born in Bonn, West Germany, to English parents. They had moved to (then) West Germany from the United Kingdom in 1980. Her father, David Horler, is a jazz musician and her mother, Christine, is a foreign languages teacher. Horler grew up with her two siblings, Sally and Victoria. Natalie soon began singing jazz songs in her father's studio as well as songs from Disney films.

Musical career

Beginnings
Horler began her musical career by singing in bars and casinos. At 18, she started to work with different DJs and recorded a number of tracks. This is how she met future bandmembers Manian and Yanou. Her most notable song of her pre-Cascada era is "Piece of Heaven" as Akira. In addition, Horler appeared on the German adaptation of Star Search in 2004.

Breakthrough with Cascada

In 2004, she formed the group Cascada with DJ Manian and Yanou (the latter known for his track with DJ Sammy and Dominique van Hulst, "Heaven", released in 2002), and began touring with her dancers Essa and Falk. Originally Cascade, the group name was soon changed to Cascada due to legal issues.

On 21 February 2006, Cascada's 14-track album titled Everytime We Touch was released in the United States. Her most successful song in the U.S remains the band's U.S. debut single "Everytime We Touch".
It was a worldwide hit, peaking at No. 10 on the US Hot 100. In addition, it peaked at No. 2 in the UK Charts, No. 1 in Israel for 2 weeks and No. 1 in Ireland for an impressive six weeks. Horler has stated that at that time that they were overwhelmed at their success, suggesting they came along at the right time, and were very lucky (particularly in the American market, where Eurodance music hardly accomplishes mainstream chart-success). The success of the album gained them a World Music Award, winning them World's Best Selling German Artist in 2007. Other well-known Cascada songs include "Bad Boy", "Miracle", "Evacuate the Dancefloor", and covers such as "Truly Madly Deeply" and "What Hurts the Most".

The band's second album, Perfect Day, was released on 3 December 2007. The album charted across Europe, peaking at No. 9 in the UK Album Charts. The single "What Hurts the Most" was a success in Canada, Germany and the U.S. It climbed to No. 10 in the UK Charts and did even better in the Swedish charts, peaking at No. 5. But its highest peak was in France at No. 2, the same position it first entered. It also peaked at No. 3 in the Austria Singles Charts. Other singles from the album include "Faded", "What Do You Want From Me?", and "Because the Night".

Cascada's third studio album, Evacuate the Dancefloor, was released in the United Kingdom in July 2009. It spawned one of their most successful singles "Evacuate the Dancefloor", which was number one in the UK and Netherlands. The album itself made it to No. 8 in the UK Albums Chart and No. 7 in the U.S. Billboard Dance/Electronic Albums. Other singles from this album include "Fever", which probably failed to chart in the UK due to no physical release. However, the single reached No. 18 in the Slovak Airplay Chart and did reach No. 3 in the UK Dance Chart, and the final single from this album was "Dangerous" which made it to No. 2 in the Dutch Tipparade (Bubbling Under) Chart and No. 10 in the Finnish Singles Chart, the song also had minor success in the UK charting at No. 67 in the UK Singles Chart.

Cascada released a new single, "Pyromania", on 19 March 2010; it was the group's least successful lead single to date, failing to reach the top 40 in the UK. It did, however, reach the top 20 in France. "San Francisco" was the next single from the upcoming album, and continued the group's new electropop direction. The single made the top 20 in Austria, Germany and the Netherlands. The release of these two singles was preceded by the release of their fourth studio album, Original Me, which was released on 20 June 2011, their lowest selling album ever, reaching No. 24 in the UK Albums Chart. The next single from the album was "Au Revoir" which failed to make much impact on any major chart, as did the final single, "Night Nurse".

On 20 March 2012, Cascada released a new single, "Summer of Love". This single was a return to Cascada's earlier dance sounds, and already improve declining record sales, reaching the top 20 in Austria, Belgium, Germany and Switzerland. The group then released a compilation album called Back on the Dancefloor.

Cascada released a new single on 22 July 2012, a cover of "The Rhythm of the Night" of Italian Eurodance group Corona which was thought to be the lead single from their fifth studio album in 2013.

Cascada's It's Christmas Time was released on 30 November 2012.

Voice

Horler has a mezzo-soprano voice with a spanning vocal range of three octaves.

Television work
In late 2006, Horler made her first foray into television as the guest host of the viewer request show Back @ Ya on bpm:tv, a Toronto-based cable channel that broadcasts all across Canada and some parts of the United States. bpm:TV specializes in playing dance and electronica music videos. 

Also in 2006, she appeared on Live with Regis and Kelly to promote her album, Everytime We Touch. She's also presented The Clubland Top 50, exclusively to the music channel, 4Music and has performed on countless television shows, mainly in Europe, one of which was promoting the UK version of Perfect Day on the UK breakfast show GMTV in 2007, performing Last Christmas live. Horler then returned to GMTV on 28 July 2008, performing "Because the Night" live. 

She returned to the GMTV studios in June 2009 to perform her new single "Evacuate the Dancefloor" with Carlprit. Horler has also made numerous appearances on The Dome, mostly to perform Cascada's latest singles although she did a one-off performance with her co-stars during the 52nd installment where she covered Heal the World. 

In 2012, Horler was one of the new judges of the ninth season of Deutschland sucht den Superstar.

Personal life
Horler is bilingual and speaks German and English fluently. Horler is the daughter of the English jazz trombonist David Horler and the niece of the English jazz pianist John Horler. Horler currently resides in Bonn, Germany.

Relationships
Since 11 May 2011, Horler has been married to the banker Moritz Raffelberg; they were privately married in Italy, with Horler wearing a dress she had designed herself. She appeared on the cover of the German August 2011 issue of Playboy magazine. On 28 May 2015, Horler's management revealed that she would be expecting her first child. On 23 September 2015, her 34th birthday, Horler announced she had given birth two days before to her daughter, Jamie.

References

External links

 
 
 

1981 births
Living people
English-language singers from Germany
English women pop singers
German dance musicians
German women pop singers
German mezzo-sopranos
German people of English descent
German television presenters
Mass media people from Bonn
Synth-pop singers
Dance-pop musicians
Eurodance musicians
Feminist musicians
21st-century German women singers
German women television presenters
Musicians from Bonn